Radio Nacional (Spanish) or Rádio Nacional (Portuguese), both meaning National Radio, may refer to:
 Rádio Nacional de Angola
 LRA Radio Nacional, Argentina
 Rádio Nacional, Brazil
 Radio Nacional de España (RNE), Spain
 Radio Nacional de Guinea Equatorial, Equatorial Guinea
 Radio Nacional de la R.A.S.D., Sahrawi Republic
 Radio Nacional del Paraguay
 Radio Nacional del Perú
 Radio Nacional del Uruguay 
 Radio Nacional de Venezuela
 Radio Nacional (Chile)